Oudaden (in Berber: ⵓⴷⴰⴷⴻⵏ) is a Moroccan musical group that plays Berber amazigh music. The band was formed in 1978 in Ben Sergao near Agadir, in the Sous region of Morocco. Its leader is Abdellah el Foua.

History 
Oudaden was founded in 1978 in Ben Sergao, near Agadir. The group has performed throughout Morocco and internationally, particularly in Europe and the United States. They performed in Malaysia at the Rainforest World Music Festival, and in Tanzania on occasion of the Sauti za Busara. Their first album was released in 1985. The band's discography has grown to thirty-eight albums, contributing to the revival of Amazigh song.

In 2012, they went on tour in France and performed, in particular, at the Arab World Institute.

Group members 
 Current members
 Abdellah el Foua (banjo and vocals)   
 Ahmed el Foua (a type of drum, and ) 
 Mohammed Amarrir (tam-tam, called )
 Larbi Amhal
 Khalid el Foua
 said ouhdi (guitar)
 Former members

Style 
Oudaden takes inspiration from traditional Amazigh music. It is one of the leaders of the Soussi style called "Tagroupit" or "Tiroubba" This new style comes right after the Tazenzart style. This type of music is often present in wedding ceremonies in the Maghreb. and almost always includes at least one banjo and electric guitar; these two instruments constitute the pillars of "Tiroubba" style.

Discography

Albums 
 2011 : Empreinte (Buda Musique)
 2012 : Mayna

References

External links 
 Official site
 OUDADEN – MAROC

Moroccan musical groups
Berber music